The  or Abukuma Mountains is a highland area of Japan that extends from the southern part of Miyagi Prefecture to the eastern part of Fukushima Prefecture and then to the northern part of Ibaraki Prefecture. Most of the highlands belong to Fukushima Prefecture.

References

External links 

 Abukuma Mountains - Britannica

Mountain ranges of Miyagi Prefecture
Mountain ranges of Fukushima Prefecture
Mountain ranges of Japan